The Rally de Portugal (formerly: Rallye de Portugal) is a rally competition held in Portugal. First held in 1967, the seventh running of the race, the 7º TAP Rallye de Portugal was the third event in the inaugural FIA World Rally Championship in 1973. The rally remained on the WRC calendar for the next 29 years, and after being dropped for 2002–2006, the event returned to Portugal in 2007. During the 1970s, 1980s and early 1990s, Rally de Portugal was a mixed event between asphalt and gravel. Currently it is an all-gravel event.

Rally de Portugal has been awarded "The Best Rally in the World" five times and in 2000 "The Most Improved Rally of the Year". The most successful driver in the history of the rally is Finland's Markku Alén, who has won the event five times (1975, 1977, 1978, 1981 and 1987).

History
The Rally of Portugal was extremely popular but also infamous due to poor crowd control. During the 1970s and especially the 1980s, Portugal was known for spectators standing on the roadway even as the cars drove by, often resulting in near-collisions, and finally in the 1986 season a collision between cars and spectators. It was the last year the Group B cars dominated the WRC scene. And it was because of a tragic accident which occurred during the rally that the future of Group B cars came under scrutiny. The final blow came at the Tour de Corse later that year with the death of Henri Toivonen.

In the first section of the rally (Sintra), in the "Lagoa Azul" stage, Portuguese works Ford rally driver Joaquim Santos came over a crest in his RS200 getting too loose through the corner. Santos managed to avoid the crowd on the outside of the corner, but he was not able to avoid the crowd on the inside of the corner. The car left the road, plunging right into the crowd, killing three and injuring dozens more. After this accident all works teams withdrew from the rally.

The combination of poor crowd behavior, and the extreme speeds of Group B cars, was not only dangerous for the crowd, but also for the drivers themselves. Former world champion Timo Salonen admitted at the '86 edition that he was scared to run first on the road. Walter Röhrl had his own theory on the crowd situation: "You just have to see the crowd as a wall and not as spectators."

It did not necessarily go any better in following years. At the 1987 edition a privately entered, FR car driven by Portuguese rally car driver Joaquim Guedes plunged into the crowd. Luckily enough this only led to minor injuries, but the crowd control was not much improved. It was not until the early 1990s that the Portuguese rally improved crowd control. Crowds were no smaller, but were better-behaved and more aware of the risks involved in spectating.

In the 1980s, the rally had a special stage at the Autódromo do Estoril.

The last WRC edition of the Portugal rally for five years was run under heavy rain in 2001. It was won by Tommi Mäkinen in a Mitsubishi Lancer Evolution. In 2002, it was replaced in favour of Germany's Rallye Deutschland. In 2005, the organisers of the Rally of Portugal announced their intentions to rejoin the WRC, this time switching locations to an area around the Algarve. This means the character of the rally has changed. It is now fully driven on gravel. This is frowned upon by the Portuguese fans, who consider the Algarve stages less exciting, which is also reflected in lower attendance numbers. In 2006, it ran as an official WRC candidate event for the 2007 WRC calendar and was formally incorporated into the 2007 calendar on 5 July 2006. The 2007 Rally Portugal was the fifth round of the season and was won by Citroën Total's Sébastien Loeb.

After a year in the Intercontinental Rally Challenge schedule, the Rally Portugal returned to the WRC calendar for the 2009 season. The competition in the 2009 Rally Portugal was set in the surroundings of Faro, capital of the Algarve region, on twisty hill sections, with fast blind corners and narrow sections. The first stage in the Estádio Algarve (Algarve Stadium) was won by Henning Solberg, but when the rally really began, Jari-Matti Latvala took the lead. However, he soon suffered a big crash, rolling his Ford Focus WRC 17 times down a steep mountain. The rally was eventually won by Loeb.

The 2020 edition of the rally was cancelled due to the COVID-19 pandemic.

Results 1967–2001

2002–2006
Rally out of World Rally Championship

2007–2014
Rally back to World Rally Championship, but held in Algarve

2015–
Rally back to its roots: North of Portugal

Notes
† – Event was shortened after stages were cancelled.

Multiple winners

Embolded drivers are competing in the World Rally Championship in the current season.
A pink background indicates an event which was not part of the World Rally Championship.

References 

 TAP Rallye de Portugal Roll of Honour at Rallybase

External links

Official website

 
Portugal
Recurring sporting events established in 1967
Portugal